Jonathan Watts (born June 28, 1981) is an American filmmaker. His credits include directing the Marvel Cinematic Universe (MCU) superhero films Spider-Man: Homecoming, Spider-Man: Far From Home, and Spider-Man: No Way Home. He also directed and co-wrote the horror film Clown and thriller film Cop Car as well as directing numerous episodes of the parody television news series Onion News Network. In terms of creating music videos, Watts has collaborated with electronic music artists such as Fatboy Slim and Swedish House Mafia among other musicians.

Early life
Watts was born on June 28, 1981 and raised in Fountain, Colorado, where he attended Fountain-Fort Carson High School. He studied film at New York University.

Career
Watts began his directing career by directing commercials for production company Park Pictures.

Watts' film career started with the short Clay Pride: Being Clay in America. A claymation film, it is a satire of films about gay issues, with the main character, Steve Thompson, coming out as "clay". Over the next decade, Watts would continue to work in short films, as well as directing several music videos for various artists including Fatboy Slim, Death Cab for Cutie, Relient K, Sleigh Bells, Head Automatica, and TV on the Radio.

Watts' feature directorial debut was the 2014 horror film, Clown. Watts and his friend Christopher Ford had made a fake trailer for a film about a father turning into a killer clown after trying on an old costume he finds in his basement. After uploading the trailer to YouTube, Watts was approached by Eli Roth with an offer to produce a feature version.

Watts' next film was the 2015 thriller, Cop Car. The film is about two young boys who steal an abandoned police car and are pursued by its murderous owner, a Sheriff played by Kevin Bacon. In an interview, Watts revealed that the idea for the film came from a dream he had when he was a child.

Watts then directed Spider-Man: Homecoming. Watts was so determined to be the director of the film that he admitted that he had "bothered" Marvel by sending them clips of a fake trailer he made for a Spider-Man movie. He admits that he was very surprised and did not know he was going to get the job until the last moment.

Watts directed the film's 2019 sequel Spider-Man: Far From Home. He reportedly became increasingly devoted to the franchise, even starting his own extensive collection of rare spiders.

Watts has also directed Spider-Man: No Way Home, which was released on December 17, 2021, where he also provided the motion-capture for Sandman while Thomas Haden Church reprised the voice of the character from Spider-Man 3. He was confirmed to be directing the third theatrical iteration of the Fantastic Four, which will be set in the Marvel Cinematic Universe but exited the project in April 2022. Watts also directed the mid-credits scene of Venom: Let There Be Carnage, a tie-in to No Way Home, which was released two months earlier on October 1, 2021. The scene was shot during the filming of No Way Home.

In September 2021, it was revealed that Watts will write and direct the thriller film Wolves starring George Clooney and Brad Pitt. He will also produce the project along with the two actors. By the end of the month, the project had been acquired by Apple Studios, and was expected to receive a "robust theatrical release".

In January 2022, Watts and his wife were announced to be joining the sixth installment of the Final Destination series as co-producers. Watts also wrote a film treatment as well, to be adapted by Lori Evans Taylor and Guy Busick.

In May 2022, it was revealed that Watts will create and executive produce an Amblin inspired Star Wars  TV series for Disney+ that is set after the events of Return of the Jedi. This series was soon revealed as Star Wars: Skeleton Crew, scheduled to premiere in 2023.

Personal life
Watts is married to former talent agent and producer Dianne McGunigle.

Filmography

Feature films

Television

Acting roles

Other roles

Music videos

Commercials

See also

List of New York University alumni

References

External links

 
 

1981 births
American film producers
American male screenwriters
American music video directors
Living people
People from Fountain, Colorado
New York University alumni
Film directors from Colorado
Screenwriters from Colorado